Semih Türkdoğan (1912 – 16 May 1994) was a Turkish sprinter. He competed in the men's 100 metres at the 1928 Summer Olympics.

References

1912 births
1994 deaths
Athletes (track and field) at the 1928 Summer Olympics
Turkish male sprinters
Olympic athletes of Turkey
Place of birth missing
20th-century Turkish people